Belhe Zaimoğlu (born 1968) is a German actress of Turkish descent. She is the sister of Feridun Zaimoğlu.

Filmography

Television

References

External links

1971 births
German people of Turkish descent
German film actresses
Living people
German television actresses